Michel Caldaguès (28 September 192622 September 2012) was a French politician.

Political opinions 
He endorsed Marine Le Pen's campaign in the 2007 French legislative election.

References 

1926 births
2012 deaths
20th-century French politicians
21st-century French politicians
Senators of Paris
Members of Parliament for Paris
Deputies of the 4th National Assembly of the French Fifth Republic
Union of Democrats for the Republic politicians
Rally for the Republic politicians
Mayors of arrondissements of Paris